Megan Lorraine Crosson (born May 13, 1994) is an American soccer defender who plays for Celtic. She previously played for the Houston Dash and Washington Spirit of the National Women's Soccer League.

Club career

Houston Dash
Crosson attended Santa Clara University, where she played for the Santa Clara Broncos from 2012 to 2016. She recorded a total of 60 appearances with nine assistances. She signed with the Houston Dash in March 2016 and made four appearances for the club during the 2016 season. She trained with the team during the 2017 preseason, but was not offered a contract for the 2017 season.

Speranza FC
Looking for more playing time after playing with Houston Dash in 2016, Crosson played abroad with Speranza FC in Japan's Nadeshiko League Division 1 for four months. Though a defender, she played seven games as a forward.

UD Granadilla Tenerife
In 2017, Crosson was signed as a defender to UDG Tenerife in Spain's Liga Iberdrola.  She officially joined the team on 17 August.

Washington Spirit
In August 2018, Crosson was temporarily signed as a replacement player to the Washington Spirit in the NWSL, making an appearance in the final match of the season.

In January 2019, Crosson signed with the Spirit ahead of the 2019 season. She scored her first professional goal on April 13, 2019, against Sky Blue FC.

Celtic
In September 2020 Crosson signed for Scottish Women's Premier League club Celtic.

References

External links 
 
 Crosson's Profile at Santa Clara Broncos

Living people
1994 births
Houston Dash players
National Women's Soccer League players
Santa Clara Broncos women's soccer players
American expatriate sportspeople in Spain
Expatriate women's footballers in Spain
People from Costa Mesa, California
Soccer players from California
Sportspeople from Orange County, California
American women's soccer players
Women's association football defenders
Washington Spirit players
American expatriate women's soccer players
American expatriate sportspeople in Japan
Expatriate women's footballers in Japan
American expatriate sportspeople in Lithuania
Expatriate women's footballers in Lithuania
Speranza Osaka-Takatsuki players
UD Granadilla Tenerife players
Gintra Universitetas players
Expatriate women's footballers in Scotland
Celtic F.C. Women players
American expatriate sportspeople in Scotland